The 1985 Prix de l'Arc de Triomphe was a horse race held at Longchamp on Sunday 6 October 1985. It was the 64th running of the Prix de l'Arc de Triomphe.

The winner was Rainbow Quest, a four-year-old colt trained in Great Britain by Jeremy Tree. The winning jockey was Pat Eddery. Sagace finished first by a neck from Rainbow Quest with Kozana two lengths away in third. After a steward's inquiry and an objection from the rider of the runner-up, the places of the first two horses was reversed.

The winning time was 2m 29.5s.

Race details
 Sponsor: Trusthouse Forte
 Purse: 
 Going: Good to firm
 Distance: 2,400 metres
 Number of runners: 15
 Winner's time: 2m 29.5s

Full result

 Abbreviations: shd = short-head; nk = neck

Winner's details
Further details of the winner, Rainbow Quest.
 Sex: Colt
 Foaled: 15 May 1981
 Country: United States
 Sire: Blushing Groom; Dam: I Will Follow (Herbager)
 Owner: Khalid Abdullah
 Breeder: Alan Clore

References

Prix de l'Arc de Triomphe
 1986
1985 in French sport
1985 in Paris
Prix de l'Arc de Triomphe